90.9 Magik FM (DXKW 90.9 MHz) is an FM station owned and operated by Century Broadcasting Network. Its studios and transmitter are located at the 2nd Floor, SCT Bldg., General Luna St., Dipolog.

References

External links
Magik FM Dipolog FB Page

Radio stations established in 2012
Radio stations in Zamboanga del Norte